The tornado outbreak sequence of May 25–June 1, 1917 was an eight-day tornado event, known as a tornado outbreak sequence, that killed at least 383 people, mostly in the Midwestern and parts of the Southeastern United States. It was the most intense and the longest continuous tornado outbreak sequence on record, with at least 66 tornadoes including 15 that were analyzed to have been violent (F4–F5) based upon reported damage. The deadliest tornado of the entire sequence produced a  track across Illinois, killing 101 people and devastating the towns of Charleston and Mattoon along with small farming communities.

Meteorological synopsis
A series of low-pressure areas affected the Central and Eastern United States between May 25 and June 1, 1917. The first of these developed by May 25 east of the Rocky Mountains in eastern Colorado. By 7:00 p.m. The next day, the low-pressure system deepened further into the morning, eventually centering near Yankton, South Dakota, about 7 a.m. CST/1300 UTC. This second low passed near Oklahoma City, Oklahoma, on the morning of May 27 and approached the St. Louis, Missouri, area in the evening. CST/0100 UTC moved northeast from near Concordia, Kansas, to Des Moines.

List of tornadoes

These numbers are likely gross underestimates. Several of the long-track events listed below are likely to be tornado families, or groups of tornadoes produced by the same storm. Because of insufficient documentation, and lack of a proper storm survey by meteorologists, it is impossible to determine where one tornado ends and another begins in certain cases. Additionally, the book by Grazulis which details the tornadoes of this event only documents "significant" tornadoes, that is, tornadoes which caused fatalities or F2 or greater damage on the Fujita scale. On average, almost 70% of tornadoes are not "significant".

May 25 event

May 26 event

May 27 event

May 28 event

May 30 event

May 31 event

June 1 event

Mattoon/Charleston, Illinois

This devastating and long-tracked event first began before noon CST in eastern Missouri, where significant hail was reported, then crossed the Mississippi River into Illinois near Pleasant Hill. Another tornado probably developed over Modesto,  to the east. In Modesto, the tornado destroyed 30 homes and damaged 35 others, with three deaths, 16 injuries, and $120,000 damage reported. Over the next , the tornado either weakened or lifted before touching down again at Dunkel, destroying many homes and barns, and continuing into Westervelt. It destroyed 10 homes and killed four people in Westervelt, but much of the damage was due to hail. Rural areas between Dunkel and Westervelt reportedly received severe damage and reported one death.

After hitting Westervelt, the tornado weakened and probably lifted before reforming and re-intensifying over southern Moultrie County. The new tornado then passed directly through the northern half of Mattoon, causing F4 damage and "near-total destruction" in its path. It destroyed 496 homes, damaged 284, and killed at least 53 people in Mattoon; in the hardest-hit areas, few walls were left standing and only small debris remained. Total damage in Mattoon reached $1.2 million. Entering Charleston, the tornado produced less severe damage than in Mattoon, perhaps due to better construction, but at least 220 homes were still destroyed, 265 badly damaged, 38 people killed, and $780,000 damage caused. The tornado then continued beyond Charleston, causing two final deaths at Embarrass before lifting, though weather officials in 1917 believed that the tornado had continued into Indiana.

At one time, this series of tornadoes was considered a single tornado. Lasting seven hours and 40 minutes and covering , it is now generally believed to have been a family of at least four, and possibly eight or more, distinct tornadoes, with either short breaks in the damage path or sections of straight-line wind damage connecting the tornado paths.

Non-tornadic effects

Aftermath/recovery

See also
List of North American tornadoes and tornado outbreaks
List of tornadoes causing 100 or more deaths

References

Bibliography

Notes

External links
 
https://web.archive.org/web/20100701073810/http://www.isws.illinois.edu/pubdoc/C/ISWSC-103.pdf

1917 natural disasters in the United States
F5 tornadoes
Tornadoes of 1917
Tornadoes in Alabama
Tornadoes in Arkansas
Tornadoes in Illinois
Tornadoes in Indiana
Tornadoes in Kansas
Tornadoes in Kentucky
Tornadoes in Mississippi
Tornadoes in Missouri
Tornadoes in Nebraska
Tornadoes in Oklahoma
Tornadoes in Tennessee
Tornadoes in Texas
Tornado outbreaks
May 1917 events
June 1917 events